The 2009 African Youth Championship is a football tournament for under 20 players.  It was held in Rwanda from 18 January until 1 February 2009. It also served as qualification for the 2009 FIFA U-20 World Cup.

Qualification

Preliminary round

The first leg was played on either the 18, 19 or 20 April 2008.  The second leg was held on either the 2, 3 or 4 May 2008.  The winners advanced to the First Round.

Congo, Nigeria, Zambia, Gambia, Côte d'Ivoire, Egypt, Cameroon, Benin, Morocco, Tunisia, Mali, Ghana, Angola, Gabon, South Africa and Burkina Faso all received byes to the First Round.

|}

First round
The First Round first leg matches were held on the 27, 28 and 29 June 2008.  The second legs were held on the 11, 12 and 13 July 2008. The winners qualified for the Second Round.

|}

Second round
The first legs were played on the 26, 27 and 28 September. The second legs were played on the 11, 12 and 13 October.  The winners qualified for the Finals.

|}

Squads

The following teams entered the tournament:

 
 
 
 
 
 
  (host)

Group stage

Group A

Group B

Knockout stage

Semi-finals

3rd Place

Final

Winner

Qualification to FIFA U-20 World Cup
The four best performing teams qualified for the 2009 FIFA U-20 World Cup.

Goal scorers

7 goals
 Ransford Osei

3 goals
 Jacques Zoua Daogari
 Phumelele Bhengu

2 goals
 Brice Owana
 Talaat
 André Ayew
 Rabiu Ibrahim

1 goal
 Patrick Ekeng Ekeng
 Germain Francelin Tiko Messina
 Ahmed Fathi Mohamed Mahmoud Mohamed
 Ahmed Hegazy
 Gladson Awako
 Dominic Adiyiah
 Koro Issa Koné
 Samba Sow

1 goal (cont)
 Kingsley Udoh
 Yakubu Alfa
 Michael Okechukwu Uchebo
 Macauley Chrisantus
 Haruna Lukman
 Frank Temile
 Jean Mugiraneza
 Elias Uzamukunda
 Yussuf Ndayishimiye
 Mduduzi Nyanda
 Thulani Serero
 Thabang Matuka
 Thulane Ngcepe
 George Maluleka

External links
Confederation of African Football
Results by RSSSF

Africa U-20 Cup of Nations
Youth Championship
International association football competitions hosted by Rwanda
2009 in Rwandan sport
2009 in youth association football